Christ the King Cathedral is a Roman Catholic church in Gaborone, Botswana. It is the mother church of the Roman Catholic Diocese of Gaborone. The current bishop is Valentine Tsamma Seane.

History
Pope John Paul II visited the cathedral on 13 September 1988.

Mass schedule
Mass is held Monday through Friday at 6:45 am and 5:00 pm. Saturday Mass in at 8:00 am in English, and Sunday Mass is held three times: 7:30 am in English, 10:00 am in Setswana, and 5:00 pm in English.

See also
Roman Catholic Diocese of Gaborone
Roman Catholicism in Botswana

References

External links
 
 Christ the King Cathedral at GCatholic.org

Roman Catholic Diocese of Gaborone
Buildings and structures in Gaborone
Roman Catholic cathedrals in Botswana
Roman Catholic churches in Botswana
Roman Catholic churches completed in 1968
1968 establishments in Botswana
20th-century Roman Catholic church buildings